This is a list of transposing instruments and their transposition:

See also 
 Transposing instrument

References

Further reading 
 Kennan, Kent Wheeler. The Technique of Orchestration, Second Edition. Englewood Cliffs, New Jersey: Prentice-Hall, Inc., 1970, 1952; 
 Del Mar, Norman. The Anatomy of the Orchestra. University of California Press, 1981

 
Musical instruments